= Chance Irvine =

American politician

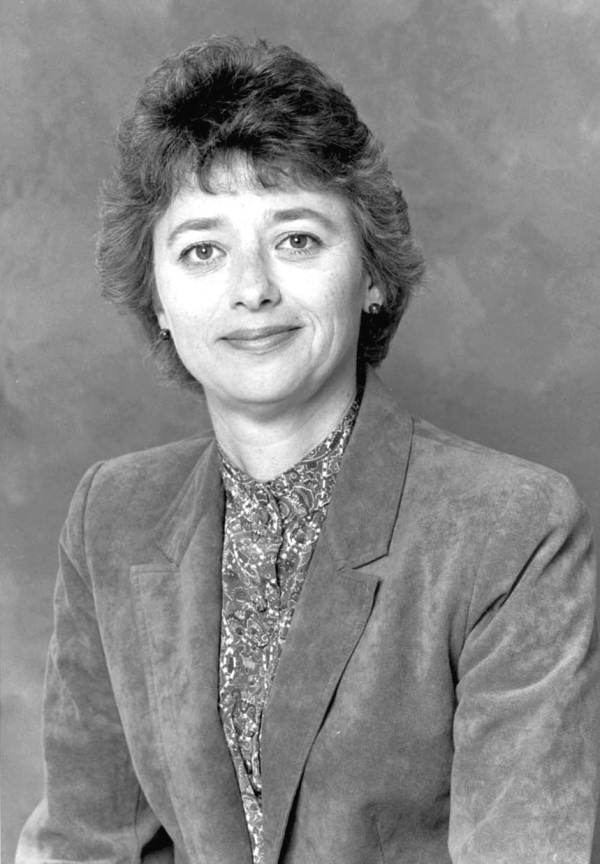

Member of the Florida House of Representatives from the 21st district
- In office 1984–1992
- Preceded by: Frank Williams
- Succeeded by: Kelley R. Smith

Personal details
- Born: November 25, 1940 (age 85) Charlottesville, Virginia, U.S.
- Party: Republican
- Spouse: John V. "Van" Irvine
- Education: Lake Erie College, College of William & Mary Marshall Wythe School of Law

Frances L. "Chance" Irvine (born November 25, 1940) was an American politician in the state of Florida.

Irvine was born in Virginia and came to Florida in 1977. She served in the Florida House of Representatives for the 21st district from 1984 to 1992, as a Republican.
